The 1970 Dartmouth Indians baseball team represented Dartmouth College in the 1970 NCAA University Division baseball season. The Indians played their home games at Red Rolfe Field. The team was coached by Tony Lupien serving his 14th year at Dartmouth.

The Indians won the Eastern Intercollegiate Baseball League championship and advanced to the College World Series, where they were defeated by the USC Trojans.

Brian DeCook  Catcher Grosse Pointe Woods Michigan

Schedule 

! style="" | Regular Season
|- valign="top" 

|- align="center" bgcolor="#ffcccc"
| 1 || March 23 || at  || Doak Field • Raleigh, North Carolina || 0–7 || 0–1 || 0–0
|- align="center" bgcolor="#ccffcc"
| 2 || March 24 || at NC State || Doak Field • Raleigh, North Carolina || 4–0 || 1–1 || 0–0
|- align="center" bgcolor="#ccffcc"
| 3 || March 24 || at NC State || Doak Field • Raleigh, North Carolina || 9–5 || 2–1 || 0–0
|- align="center" bgcolor="#ffcccc"
| 4 || March 25 || at NC State || Doak Field • Raleigh, North Carolina || 1–4 || 2–2 || 0–0
|- align="center" bgcolor="#ffcccc"
| 5 || March 25 || at NC State || Doak Field • Raleigh, North Carolina || 3–4 || 2–3 || 0–0
|- align="center" bgcolor="#ffcccc"
| 6 || March 26 || at  || Ernie Shore Field • Winston-Salem, North Carolina || 6–7 || 2–4 || 0–0
|- align="center" bgcolor="#ffcccc"
| 7 || March 27 || at  || Unknown • Greenville, North Carolina || 0–1 || 2–5 || 0–0
|- align="center" bgcolor="#ffcccc"
| 8 || March 28 || at East Carolina || Unknown • Greenville, North Carolina || 1–8 || 2–6 || 0–0
|-

|- align="center" bgcolor="#ffcccc"
| 9 || April 10 || at  || Robertson Field at Satow Stadium • New York, New York || 5–10 || 2–7 || 0–1
|- align="center" bgcolor="#ccffcc"
| 10 || April 11 || at  || Bill Clarke Field • Princeton, New Jersey || 5–0 || 3–7 || 1–1
|- align="center" bgcolor="#ffcccc"
| 11 || April 11 || at Princeton || Bill Clarke Field • Princeton, New Jersey || 7–8 || 3–8 || 1–2
|- align="center" bgcolor="#ccffcc"
| 12 || April 13 ||  || Red Rolfe Field • Hanover, New Hampshire || 7–3 || 4–8 || 1–2
|- align="center" bgcolor="#ccffcc"
| 13 || April 18 || at  || Soldier's Field • Boston, Massachusetts || 5–2 || 5–8 || 2–2
|- align="center" bgcolor="#ccffcc"
| 14 || April 18 || at Harvard || Soldier's Field • Boston, Massachusetts || 1–0 || 6–8 || 3–2
|- align="center" bgcolor="#ccffcc"
| 15 || April 25 || at  || Yale Field • West Haven, Connecticut || 7–4 || 7–8 || 4–2
|- align="center" bgcolor="#ccffcc"
| 16 || April 25 || at Yale || Yale Field • West Haven, Connecticut || 3–2 || 8–8 || 5–2
|- align="center" bgcolor="#ccffcc"
| 17 || April 26 || at  || Murray Stadium • Providence, Rhode Island || 16–10 || 9–8 || 6–2
|- align="center" bgcolor="#ccffcc"
| 18 || April 29 || at  || Unknown • Amherst, Massachusetts || 8–4 || 10–8 || 6–2
|-

|- align="center" bgcolor="#ccffcc"
| 19 || May 1 ||  || Red Rolfe Field • Hanover, New Hampshire || 13–3 || 11–8 || 7–2
|- align="center" bgcolor="#ccffcc"
| 20 || May 2 ||  || Red Rolfe Field • Hanover, New Hampshire || 3–2 || 12–8 || 8–2
|- align="center" bgcolor="#ccffcc"
| 21 || May 2 || Cornell || Red Rolfe Field • Hanover, New Hampshire || 3–2 || 13–8 || 9–2
|- align="center" bgcolor="#ccffcc"
| 22 || May 8 ||  || Red Rolfe Field • Hanover, New Hampshire || 9–8 || 14–8 || 10–2
|- align="center" bgcolor="#ccffcc"
| 23 || May 9 ||  || Red Rolfe Field • Hanover, New Hampshire || 4–2 || 15–8 || 10–2
|- align="center" bgcolor="#ccffcc"
| 24 || May 12 || at  || Eddie Pellagrini Diamond at John Shea Field • Chestnut Hill, Massachusetts || 6–5 || 16–8 || 10–2
|- align="center" bgcolor="#ccffcc"
| 25 || May 13 || at  || Unknown • Durham, New Hampshire || 4–2 || 17–8 || 10–2
|- align="center" bgcolor="#ccffcc"
| 26 || May 16 ||  || Red Rolfe Field • Hanover, New Hampshire || 5–0 || 18–8 || 11–2
|- align="center" bgcolor="#ccffcc"
| 27 || May 22 || at  || Unknown • Springfield, Massachusetts || 5–3 || 19–8 || 11–2
|- align="center" bgcolor="#ccffcc"
| 28 || May 25 ||  || Red Rolfe Field • Hanover, New Hampshire || 4–0 || 20–8 || 11–2
|-

|-
|-
! style="" | Postseason
|- valign="top"

|- align="center" bgcolor="#ccffcc"
| 29 || June 2 ||  || Red Rolfe Field • Hanover, New Hampshire || 7–2 || 21–8 || 11–2
|- align="center" bgcolor="#ccffcc"
| 30 || June 3 ||  || Red Rolfe Field • Hanover, New Hampshire || 8–2 || 22–8 || 11–2
|- align="center" bgcolor="#ccffcc"
| 31 || June 4 || Connecticut || Red Rolfe Field • Hanover, New Hampshire || 12–3 || 23–8 || 11–2
|-

|- align="center" bgcolor="#ccffcc"
| 32 || June 13 || vs Iowa State || Johnny Rosenblatt Stadium • Omaha, Nebraska || 7–6 || 24–8 || 11–2
|- align="center" bgcolor="#ffcccc"
| 33 || June 14 || vs Florida State || Johnny Rosenblatt Stadium • Omaha, Nebraska || 0–6 || 24–9 || 11–2
|- align="center" bgcolor="#ffcccc"
| 14 || June 15 || vs USC || Johnny Rosenblatt Stadium • Omaha, Nebraska || 1–6 || 24–10 || 11–2
|-

|-
|

Awards and honors 
Craig Conklin
 First Team All-EIBL

Tom Hanna
 Second Team All-EIBL

Bruce Saylor
 First Team All-EIBL

Chuck Seelbach
 First Team All-EIBL

References 

Dartmouth Big Green baseball seasons
Dartmouth Big Green baseball
College World Series seasons
Eastern Intercollegiate Baseball League baseball champion seasons